Sphyracephala is a genus of stalk-eyed flies in the family Diopsidae. It resembles the presumed extinct genus Prosphyracephala, known from Baltic amber.

Species
S. hearseiana (Westwood, 1844)
S. beccarii Rondani, 1873
S. europaea Papp & Foldvari, 1997
S. nigrimana Loew, 1873

References

Diopsidae
Diopsoidea genera